Antónia of Portugal (or of Braganza; ; Antónia Maria Fernanda Micaela Gabriela Rafaela Francisca de Assis Ana Gonzaga Silvéria Júlia Augusta de Saxe-Coburgo e Bragança; 17 February 1845 – 27 December 1913) was a Portuguese infanta (princess) of the House of Braganza, daughter of Queen Maria II of Portugal and her King consort Ferdinand II of Portugal. Through her father, she also held the titles of Princess of Saxe-Coburg and Gotha and Duchess of Saxony.

Life

Antónia was born in 1845 at the Palace of Belém, she was the sixth child of twelve, and the third girl.  She married Leopold, Prince of Hohenzollern-Sigmaringen on 12 September 1861. They had three sons;
 William (1864–1927), who succeeded as Prince of Hohenzollern; married (1) Princess Maria Teresa of Bourbon-Two Sicilies (2) Princess Adelgunde of Bavaria
 Ferdinand  (1865–1927), later King of Romania; married Princess Marie of Edinburgh
 Karl Anton (1868–1919), married Princess Josephine Caroline of Belgium

Antónia of Braganza died in the German Empire in 1913.

Honours and awards
 :
 Dame of the Order of Queen Saint Isabel
 Grand Cross of the Immaculate Conception of Vila Viçosa
  Kingdom of Prussia:
 Dame of the Order of Louise, 1st Division
 Cross of Merit for Women and Girls, 26 June 1871
 : Dame of the Order of the Starry Cross, 1st Class
    Ernestine duchies: Grand Cross of the Saxe-Ernestine House Order
 : Dame of the Decoration of the Cross of Queen Elisabeth
 : Dame of the Order of Queen Maria Luisa, 23 October 1855

Ancestry

References

1845 births
1913 deaths
People from Lisbon
Portuguese infantas
House of Braganza-Saxe-Coburg and Gotha
Princesses of Hohenzollern-Sigmaringen
Dames of the Order of Saint Isabel
Knights Grand Cross of the Order of the Immaculate Conception of Vila Viçosa
19th-century Portuguese people
19th-century German women
Daughters of kings